The parent article is at List of University of Michigan alumni

This is a list of sporting persons who attended the University of Michigan.

Sports

Baseball
Jim Abbott, 1989, one-handed major-league baseball pitcher for California Angels and New York Yankees 
Pete Appleton, accomplished pianist and band leader; opted for a baseball career after graduating from the University of Michigan
Steve Boros, former Detroit Tigers infielder 
Jim Burton (baseball), former Boston Red Sox pitcher 
Mike Cervenak, former MLB infielder 
Danny Fife, former Major League Baseball player 
Bill Freehan, former All-Star and Golden Glove catcher, Detroit Tigers 
Elmer Gedeon, Major League Baseball player killed in action in World War II 
Charlie Gehringer, Baseball Hall of Fame second baseman 
Rick Hahn, general manager of the Chicago White Sox
Drew Henson, played NFL football and MLB baseball 
Steve Howe (baseball), former MLB pitcher 
Scott Kamieniecki, former MLB pitcher 
Henry Killilea (1863-1929), one of the five men who founded baseball's American League as a major league in 1899 
Barry Larkin, 1986, former Cincinnati Reds baseball player, 1995 National League MVP, Baseball Hall of Fame 
Chick Lathers, former MLB infielder 
Doc Lavan, former MLB infielder 
Rick Leach (baseball), former MLB outfielder 
Don Lund (born 1923), former backup outfielder in Major League Baseball who played for the Brooklyn Dodgers, St. Louis Browns and Detroit Tigers 
Tom Lundstedt, former Major League catcher for Chicago Cubs and Minnesota Twins 
Elliott Maddox (born 1947), won the 1967 Big Ten batting title with a .467 average; former player for six MLB teams 
Mike Matheny, manager of the St. Louis Cardinals 
Hal Morris, former MLB first baseman 
Steve Ontiveros (pitcher), former MLB pitcher 
Bennie Oosterbaan, former University of Michigan baseball and football player 
Slicker Parks, former Detroit Tigers pitcher 
Steve Phillips, former GM of the New York Mets, ESPN analyst 
J. J. Putz, MLB relief pitcher 
Branch Rickey, 1911, former president and general manager of the Brooklyn Dodgers who integrated Major League Baseball by signing Jackie Robinson
Leon Roberts, former MLB baseball player 
William A. Roman, University of Michigan team captain senior year; Detroit Tigers first baseman, 1964–65, who also was awarded the National Medal of Technology and Innovation
Chris Sabo, former third baseman for Cincinnati Reds 
Bobby Scales, second baseman for the Chicago Cubs 
Brian Simmons (baseball), former Major League Baseball outfielder 
George Sisler, first baseman for St. Louis Browns, member of Baseball Hall of Fame 
Ted Sizemore, former MLB infielder 
Lary Sorensen, former MLB pitcher 
Dick Wakefield, former Detroit Tigers outfielder 
Moses Fleetwood Walker, former professional baseball player in 1884; believed to be first African-American to play major-league baseball
Geoff Zahn, former MLB pitcher 
Bill Zepp, former MLB pitcher

Draftees
Baseball draftees, by year, team and round from 2005 to 1965:
Chris Getz	2005, Chicago White Sox, 4th 
Clayton Richard, 2005, Chicago White Sox, 8th 
Derek Feldkamp, 2005, Tampa Bay Devil Rays, 9th 
Jim Brauer, 2005, Florida Marlins, 9th 
Michael Penn (baseball), 2005, Kansas City Royals, 11th 
Kyle Bohm,	2005, Toronto Blue Jays, 16th 
Jeff Kunkel, 2005, Detroit Tigers, 37th 
Derek Feldkamp, 2004, Toronto Blue Jays, 41st 
Jim Brauer, 2004, New York Mets, 42nd 
Brandon Roberts (baseball), 2004, Cincinnati Reds, 45th 
Jake Fox, 2003, Chicago Cubs, 3rd 
Brock Koman, 2003, Houston Astros, 9th 
Jim Brauer, 2003, Colorado Rockies, 17th 
Rich Hill (baseball), 2002, Chicago Cubs, 4th 
Bobby Korecky, 2002, Philadelphia Phillies, 19th 
Rich Hill, 2001, California Angels, 7th 
Bobby Wood, 2001, New York Yankees, 24th 
David Parrish, 2000, New York Yankees, 1st (28th pick) 
J. J. Putz, 1999, Seattle, 6th 
Brian Bush, 1999, Philadelphia, 12th 
Bobby Scales, 1999, San Diego, 14th 
Mike Seestedt, 1999, Baltimore, 26th 
Brian Berryman, 1998, San Diego, 7th 
J. J. Putz, 1998, Minnesota, 17th 
Derek Besco, 1998, Detroit, 25th 
Mike Cervenak, 1998, Oakland A's, 43rd 
Kelly Dransfeldt, 1996, Texas, 2nd 
Brian Steinbach, 1996, Milwaukee Brewers, 54th 
Brian Simmons, 1995, Chicago White Sox, 2nd 
Scott Weaver, 1995, Detroit, 8th 
Ryan Van Oeveren, 1995, Montreal, 26th 
Matt Ferullo, 1995,  New York Mets, 31st 
Heath Murray, 1994, San Diego, 3rd 
Ray Ricken, 1994, New York Yankees, 5th 
Ron Hollis, 1994, Los Angeles, 10th 
Chris Newton (baseball), 1994, Detroit, 27th 
Nate Holdren, 1993, Colorado, 16th 
Derek Jeter, 1992, New York, 1st (6th overall) 
Dennis Konuszewski, 1992, Pittsburgh, 9th 
Russell Brock,	1991, Oakland, 2nd 
Tim Flannelly, 1991, New York Yankees, 3rd 
Jason Pfaff, 1991, Detroit, 8th 
Mike Matheny, 1991, Milwaukee Brewers, 8th 
Andy Fairman, 1991, Milwaukee Brewers, 24th 
Dan Ruff, 1991, Detroit, 31st 
Kirt Ojala, 1990, New York Yankees, 4th 
Matt Morse, 1990, Minnesota, 19th 
Greg Haeger, 1990, Detroit, 21st 
Greg McMurtry, 1990, Detroit, 27th 
Ross Powell, 1989, Cincinnati, 3rd 
Mike Grimes, 1989, Oakland, 3rd 
Tim Lata, 1989, St. Louis, 36th 
John Locker, 1989, Boston, 40th 
Jim Abbott, 1988, California, 1st (8th pick) 
Bill St. Peter, 1988, Chicago Cubs, 7th 
Mike Ignasiak, 1988, Milwaukee Brewers, 8th 
Steve Finken, 1988, Los Angeles, 21st
Mike Gillette, 1988, Kansas City Royals, 34th 
Chris Lutz, 1988, Chicago Cubs, 43rd 
Tom Brock, 1988, Seattle, 46th 
Mike Ignasiak, 1987, St. Louis, 4th 
Jim Agemy, 1987, New York Yankees,	51st 
Casey Close, 1986, New York Yankees, 7th 
Hal Morris, 1986, New York Yankees, 8th 
Dan Disher, 1986, Seattle, 10th 
Scott Kamieniecki, 1986, New York Yankees, 14th (& 1985 by Brewers − 16th) 
David Karasinski, 1986, Atlanta, 42nd 
Barry Larkin, 1985, Cincinnati, 1st (4th pick) 
Mike Watters, 1985, Los Angeles, 2nd 
Dan Disher, 1985, Detroit, 27th 
Gary Wayne, 1984, Montreal, 4th 
Gary Grant (basketball), 1984, Milwaukee Brewers, 16th 
Bill Shuta, 1984, Detroit, 34th 
Rich Stoll, 1983, Montreal, 1st (14th pick) 
Chris Sabo, 1983, Cincinnati, 2nd 
Dave Kopf, 1983, Chicago Cubs, 3rd 
Jeff Jacobson (baseball), 1983, Baltimore, 11th 
Gary Wayne, 1983, Oakland, 23rd 
Steve Ontiveros (pitcher), 1982, Oakland, 2nd 
Tony Evans, 1982, Cincinnati, 6th 
Jim Paciorek, 1982, Milwaukee Brewers, 8th 
John Young, 1982, Detroit, 19th 
Jeff Jacobson (baseball), 1982, Detroit, 27th 
Scot Elam, 1981, Toronto, 10th 
Jim Paciorek, 1981, Cleveland, 14th 
Gerry Hool, 1981, Toronto, 15th 
Mark Clinton, 1981, Houston, 17th 
George Foussianes, 1980, Detroit, 36th 
Rick Leach (baseball), 1979, Detroit, 1st (13th pick) 
Steve Howe (baseball), 1979, Los Angeles, 1st (16th pick) 
Steve Perry, 1979, Los Angeles, 1st (25th pick) 
George Foussianes, 1979, Montreal, 28th 
Mike Parker (baseball), 1978, San Diego, 8th 
Rick Leach, 1978, Philadelphia, 24th 
David Chapman, 1978, Texas, 37th 
Lary Sorensen, 1976, Milwaukee Brewers, 8th 
Dick Walterhouse, 1976, Pittsburgh, 19th 
Chuck Rogers, 1975, Chicago Cubs, 8th 
Tom Joyce (baseball), 1975, Chicago White Sox, 27th 
James (Randy) Hackney, 1975, Chicago Cubs, 29th
John Lonchar, 1974, Minnesota, 7th 
Mark Crane, 1973, Philadelphia, 13th 
Tom Kettinger, 1973, Pittsburgh, 30th 
Tom Lundstedt, 1970, Chicago Cubs, 1st 
John Hurley (baseball), 1969, Minnesota, 1st 
Glen Redmon, 1969, Chicago White Sox, 19th 
Geoff Zahn, 1968, Los Angeles, 5th 
Elliott Maddox, 1968, Detroit, 1st 
Steve Evans (baseball, born 1940s), 1968, St. Louis, 1st
John Hurley (baseball), 1968, Detroit, 2nd 
Dave Renkiewicz, 1968, Chicago White Sox, 4th 
Gerald Christman, 1968, San Francisco, 6th 
Nikola Radakovik, 1967, Houston, 2nd 
Geoff Zahn, 1967, Boston, 5th 
Bill Zepp, 1967, Boston, 7th 
Leslie Tanona, 1967, Detroit, 4th 
Keith Spicer, 1967, Minnesota, 18th 
Geoff Zahn, 1967, Detroit, 2nd 
Dave Renkiewicz, 1967, Chicago White Sox, 6th 
John Hurley (baseball), 1967, Chicago White Sox, 15th 
Bob Reed (football), 1966, Washington, 2nd 
Richard Schryer, 1966, Chicago White Sox, 6th 
Robert Gilhooley, 1966, Detroit, 3rd 
Nikola Radakovik, 1966, Kansas City A's, 10th 
Chandler Simonds, 1966, Detroit, 12th 
Ted Sizemore, 1966, Los Angeles, 15th 
Cazzie Russell, 1966, Kansas City A's, 27th 
Geoff Zahn, 1966, Chicago White Sox, 34th 
Bob Reed (football), 1966, Detroit, 2nd
Richard Schryer, 1966, Los Angeles, 2nd 
Bill Zepp, 1966, Detroit, 8th 
Bob Reed (football), 1965, Detroit, 4th
Carl Cmejrek, 1965, Baltimore, 24th 
Bill Zepp, 1965, Milwaukee Braves, 33rd 
Dan Fife, ????, Detroit, 2nd 
Michael Elwood, 1972, California Angels, 5th 
Leon Roberts, ????, Detroit, 10th

Basketball (men's)

Maceo Baston, 1994–1997, basketball player 
Bill Buntin, 1963–1965, All-American, U-M record with 58 double-doubles 
Trey Burke, 2012, 2013 professional basketball player 
Jamal Crawford, 2001, professional basketball player 
Stu Douglass (born 1990), American-Israeli basketball player for the Israeli team Maccabi Ashdod
Gary Grant, 1984–1988, All-American 1987–1988, professional, #15 draft pick to Seattle SuperSonics 
Tim Hardaway Jr.
Manny Harris, 2007–2009, professional basketball player 
Juwan Howard, 1991–1993, "Fab Five" member, professional basketball player 
Ray Jackson (basketball), 1991–1994, "Fab Five" member, former professional basketball player
Jimmy King, 1991–1994, "Fab Five" member, former professional basketball player 
Tony Peyton, 1922–2007, last surviving member of the original Harlem Globetrotters
Krista Lynn Phillips (born 1988), Canadian basketball centre for the Dandenong Rangers of the Australian WNBL
Jordan Poole,
Richard Rellford (born 1964), basketball player
Glen Rice, basketball player; Most Outstanding Player of the 1989 men's basketball Final Four; holds NCAA record for most total points in a single NCAA tournament, with 184 
Bernard Robinson (basketball), basketball player 
Rumeal Robinson, basketball player 1987–1990
Jalen Rose, 1991–1994, "Fab Five" member, professional basketball player 
Cazzie Russell, 1964–66, basketball player 
Maurice Taylor, basketball player 
Rudy Tomjanovich, 1966–1970, basketball player and coach 
John Townsend (basketball), 1936–38, All-American
Robert Traylor, basketball player 
Chris Webber, 1991–1993, "Fab Five" member, professional basketball player, first overall pick in the 1993 NBA Draft

Basketball (women's)
Trish Andrew, UM record holder for rebounds and blocks
Diane Dietz, UM's 2nd all-time scoring leader with 2,076 points, set Big Ten single-game scoring record with 45 points in 1982, inducted into Athletic Hall of Honor in 1996 
Pollyanna Johns Kimbrough, Jamaican-born center, led UM in scoring and rebounds three straight years, holds UM records for career shooting percentage (.552), single-season shooting percentage (.662 in the 1997–98 season), and career rebounding percentage (9.6 per game), played six season in the WNBA 
Krista Phillips, played for Team Canada in the 2012 Summer Olympics 
Stacey Thomas, played six season in the WNBA

Football

Jeff Backus, NFL football player 
Ronald Bellamy, NFL football player 
Tim Biakabutuka, NFL football player 
Grant Bowman, NFL practice-squad player 
Tom Brady, 2000, Retired NFL quarterback, four-time Super Bowl MVP 
Alan Branch, NFL football player 
David Brandt (American football), NFL football player 
Tony Branoff, halfback for University of Michigan, 1952-55 
Steve Breaston, NFL football player 
Dave Brown (cornerback), NFL football player 
Prescott Burgess, NFL football player 
Mark Campbell (tight end), NFL football player 
Brian Carpenter, 1982, NFL football player 
Anthony Carter (American football), NFL football player 
Todd Collins (quarterback), NFL football player 
Markus Curry, NFL football player 
Dan Dierdorf, 1971, sportscaster and NFL tackle; member of Pro Football Hall of Fame 
Kevin Dudley, NFL football player 
Tyler Ecker, NFL football player 
Braylon Edwards, 2005, NFL wide receiver, 2004 winner of Fred Biletnikoff Award 
Stanley Edwards, 1982, NFL football player 
Rich Eisen, 1990, NFL Network broadcaster
 Hayden Epstein (born 1980), NFL football player
Forest Evashevski, 1941, football player, head coach at Washington State and Iowa, member of College Football Hall of Fame 
Steve Everitt, NFL football player 
Jay Feely, NFL football player 
Bill Flemming (LS&A), sportscaster
Larry Foote, NFL football player 
Gerald Ford, 38th President of the United States 
Benny Friedman, "Benny revolutionized football", the Bears' George Halas once said; Friedman's value was so great that Giants owner Tim Mara bought the Detroit Wolverines franchise in 1929 just so he could add him to his roster; College Football Hall of Fame and Pro Football Hall of Fame inductee 
Ian Gold, NFL football player 
Jonathan Goodwin (American football), NFL football player 
Elvis Grbac, NFL football player 
Brian Griese, NFL football player 
James Hall (American football), NFL football player 
Leon Hall, NFL football player 
Jim Harbaugh, 1986, NFL quarterback, former head coach of Stanford and the San Francisco 49ers, current head coach of Michigan Wolverines football team 
Tom Harmon, 1941, football player; 1940 Heisman Trophy winner and sportscaster; member of College Football Hall of Fame 
David Harris (American football), NFL football player 
Mercury Hayes, NFL and CFL football player 
Tommy Hendricks, NFL football player 
Dwight Hicks, NFL football defensive back 
Elroy Hirsch (aka "Crazy Legs" Hirsch), football player; only Michigan athlete to letter in four sports in a single year; NFL receiver; University of Wisconsin athletic director; member of College Football Hall of Fame and Pro Football Hall of Fame 
Victor Hobson, NFL football player 
Dick Honig, college football and basketball referee
Desmond Howard, 1992, football player, 1991 Heisman Trophy winner and Super Bowl XXXI MVP
Aidan Hutchinson, NFL football player
Steve Hutchinson (American football), NFL football player 
Marlin Jackson, NFL defensive back 
Dana Jacobson (BA 1993), sportscaster
Jon Jansen, NFL football player 
George Jewett, athlete who became the first African American college football player at the University of Michigan 
Ron Johnson (running back) (BUS: BBA 1969), NFL football player 
Dhani Jones, 2000, NFL football player, host of ESPN's Timeless 
Bennie Joppru, NFL football player 
Cato June, NFL football player 
Alain Kashama, NFL football player 
Marcus Knight, NFL football player 
Ty Law, NFL football player 
Jeremy LeSueur, NFL football player 
Rob Lytle, NFL football player 
Joe Magidsohn, football All-American 
Roy Manning, NFL football player 
Tim Massaquoi, NFL football player 
John Maulbetsch, All-American halfback at Adrian College in 1911 and University of Michigan 1914 to 1916 
Earl Maves, NFL football player 
Bill Mazer (BA) (b. 1920 Kiev, at that time a part of Russia), TV/radio personality; emigrated from former Soviet Union before his first birthday, grew up in Brooklyn, New York; during World War II, served in US Armed Forces-Air Force Transport Command in the Pacific theatre
Zoltan Mesko (BUS: BBA 2009; SOK: AM 2010), NFL football player 
Les Miles, head coach of Kansas; former assistant coach at University of Michigan (1980–81); Dallas Cowboys tight ends coach (1998–2000), won National Championship at LSU in 2007 
Jamie Morris, NFL football player 
John Navarre, NFL football player 
David M. Nelson (B.S. 1942), head football coach, athletic director, and dean of the University of Delaware 
Harry Newman, football All-American, Douglas Fairbanks Trophy as Outstanding College Player of the Year (predecessor of the Heisman Trophy), College Football Hall of Fame, NFL player 
Shantee Orr, NFL football player 
Tony Pape, NFL football player 
DeWayne Patmon, NFL football player 
Dave Pearson (American football), NFL football player 
Chris Perry (American football), NFL football player 
Merv Pregulman, NFL football player 
Jay Riemersma, NFL football player 
Jon Runyan, 1995, NFL football player 
Ernest Shazor, NFL football player 
Aaron Shea, NFL football player 
Greg Skrepenak, NFL football player, Luzerne County (Pennsylvania) commissioner 
Larry Stevens, NFL football player 
Tai Streets, NFL football player 
Bert Sugar (LAW: JD 1961; BUS: MBA 1961), former publisher-editor of Ring magazine
David Terrell (wide receiver), NFL football player 
Anthony Thomas (American football), NFL football player 
Amani Toomer, NFL football player 
Jerame Tuman, NFL football player 
Irv Utz, namesake of Irv Utz Stadium (dedicated in 2011) at Washington University, where he was head baseball coach; Kelley field complex was officially renamed in his honor in 2011; member of Washington University Sports Hall of Fame, coach and administrator there for more than 16 years, also Washington University's head football coach; All-American football player at the University of Michigan
Gabe Watson, NFL football player 
Andre Weathers, NFL football player 
Tyrone Wheatley, NFL football player 
Gerald White, NFL football player 
James Whitley (American football), NFL football player 
Stu Wilkins (born c. 1928), football player, lawyer, and businessman; played guard for the University of Michigan from 1945 to 1948; one of the leaders behind the establishment of the Pro Football Hall of Fame in Canton 
Josh Williams (American football), NFL football player 
Maurice Williams (offensive tackle), NFL football player 
Eric Wilson (linebacker, born 1962), NFL football player 
Hugh E. Wilson, head football and baseball coach at Louisiana Tech 
Chuck Winters, CFL player, Grey Cup champion 
Irv Wisniewski, head basketball and golf coach, assistant football coach at the University of Delaware 
LaMarr Woodley, NFL football player 
Pierre Woods, NFL football player 
Charles Woodson, 1997, NFL football player and 1997 Heisman Trophy winner 
Butch Woolfolk, NFL football player 
Tracy Wolfson, CBS Sports reporter

Football: Consensus All-American

Michigan's Football All-Americans: 120 individual players have earned first-team All-American honors, representing 142 separate citations, including two three-time winners and eighteen two-time All-Americans.

Name, position, year
Jake Long, OL, 2007 
Jake Long, OL, 2006 
Braylon Edwards, WR, 2004 
David Baas, OL, 2004 
Marlin Jackson, DB, 2004 
Ernest Shazor, DB, 2004 
Chris Perry, RB, 2003 
Steve Hutchinson, OL, 2000 
Charles Woodson, DB, 1997 
Jarrett Irons, LB, 1996 
Desmond Howard, WR, 1991 
Greg Skrepenak, OL, 1991 
Tripp Welborne, DB, 1990 
Tripp Welborne, DB, 1989 
John Vitale, C, 1988 
Mark Messner, DL, 1988 
John Elliot, OL, 1987 
Garland Rivers, DB, 1986 
Mike Hammerstein, DL, 1985 
Brad Cochran, DB, 1985 
Anthony Carter, WR, 1981–1982 
Ed Muransky, OL, 1981 
Kurt Becker, OL, 1981 
Ron Simpkins, LB, 1979 
Mark Donahue, G, 1977 
Rob Lytle, RB, 1976 
Mark Donahue, G, 1976 
Dave Brown, DB, 1974 
Dave Gallagher, DL, 1973 
Dave Brown, DB, 1973 
Paul Seymour, T, 1972 
Randy Logan, DB, 1972 
Reggie McKenzie, G, 1971 
Mike Taylor, LB, 1971
Dan Dierdorf, T, 1970 
Jim Mandich, E, 1969 
Tom Curtis, DB, 1969 
Jack Clancy, E, 1966 
Bill Yearby, DT, 1965 
Ron Kramer, E, 1956 
Ron Kramer, E, 1955 
Alvin Wistert, T, 1949 
Dick Rifenburg, E, 1948 
Alvin Wistert, T, 1948 
Bob Chappuis, B, 1947 
Bill Daley, B, 1943 
Albert Wistert, T, 1942 
Julius Franks, G, 1942 
Bob Westfall, B, 1941 
Tom Harmon, B, 1940 
Tom Harmon, B, 1939 
Ralph Heikkinen, G, 1938 
Francis Wistert, T, 1933 
Chuck Bernard, C, 1933 
Harry Newman, B, 1932 
Otto Pommerening, T, 1928 
Bennie Oosterbaan, E, 1927 
Bennie Oosterbaan, B, 1926 
Benny Friedman, B, 1926 
Bennie Oosterbaan, E, 1925 
Benny Friedman, B, 1925 
Jack Blott, C, 1923 
Harry Kipke, B, 1922 
John Maulbetsch, B, 1914 
Miller Pontius, B, 1913 
Stanfield Wells, E, 1910 
Stanfield Wells, G, 1910 
Albert Benbrook, G, 1909 
Adolph "Germany" Schulz, C, 1907 
Willie Heston, B, 1904 
Willie Heston, B, 1903 
Neil Snow, E, 1901 
William Cunningham, C, 1898

Golf
Gary Wiren, PGA Master Professional instructor and SPGA golfer

Gymnastics
Syque Caesar, represented Bangladesh at the 2012 Summer Olympics in London
Chris Cameron, 2010 NCAA all-around champion
Gilbert Larose, 1963 NCAA all-around champion
Sam Mikulak, 2011 NCAA all-around champion
Elise Ray, first-team All-American, 2002, 2003, and 2004, bronze medalist at 2000 Summer Olympics
Beth Wymer, first-team All-American, 1992, 1993, 1994, and 1995

Hockey

Red Berenson (BUS: BBA 1962, MBA 1966), retired in 2017 after 33 years as head coach of the Michigan men's hockey team 
Mike Brown, San Jose Sharks 
Mike Cammalleri, New Jersey Devils 
Andrew Cogliano, Anaheim Ducks 
Mike Comrie, New York Islanders 
Andrew Ebbett, Chicago Blackhawks 
Carl Hagelin, Pittsburgh Penguin 
Matt Herr, ice hockey forward 
Vic Heyliger, 1935–38, All-American 
Quinn Hughes, Vancouver Canucks 
Zach Hyman, Toronto Maple Leafs
Jack Johnson, Columbus Blue Jackets 
Mike Knuble, Washington Capitals 
Chad Kolarik, Phoenix Coyotes 
Mike Komisarek, Carolina Hurricanes 
John Madden, center for the Minnesota Wild 
Al Montoya, goalie, first Cuban-American selected in NHL entry draft 
Brendan Morrison, 1997, center and 17th Hobey Baker Memorial Award winner in 1997 
Eric Nystrom, 2005, Calgary Flames, now on the Nashville Predators 
Jed Ortmeyer, San Jose Sharks; former captain of the Wolverines; not drafted 
Max Pacioretty, Montreal Canadiens 
Kevin Porter, Phoenix Coyotes 
John Harold "Johnny" Sherf (BA 1936),  NHL player, first U.S. citizen to have his name engraved on the Stanley Cup 
Steve Shields, Buffalo Sabres, San Jose Sharks 
Jeff Tambellini, Los Angeles Kings
Marty Turco, NHL goaltender, Most Outstanding Player of the 1998 Frozen Four; 2006 Canadian Olympic Team selection 
Aaron Ward, NHL player

Hockey draftees
Hockey draftees by team, year and round drafted, for the years 2006 to 1969:

Billy Sauer, Colorado Avalanche, 2006, 7 
Chris Summers, Phoenix Coyotes, 2006, 1 
Mark Mitera, Anaheim Ducks, 2006, 1 
Jason Bailey, Mighty Ducks of Anaheim, 2005, 3 
T. J. Hensick, Colorado Avalanche, 2005, 3 
Jack Johnson, Carolina Hurricanes, 2005, 1 
Chad Kolarik, Phoenix Coyotes, 2004, 7 
Matt Hunwick, Boston Bruins, 2004, 7 
Mike Brown, Vancouver Canucks, 2004, 5 
Al Montoya, New York Rangers, 2004, 1 
David Rohlfs, Edmonton Oilers, 2003, 5 
Tim Cook, Ottawa Senators, 2003, 5 
Danny Richmond, Carolina Hurricanes, 2003, 2 
Jeff Tambellini, Los Angeles Kings, 2003, 1 
Dwight Helminen, Edmonton Oilers, 2002, 8 
Jason Ryznar, New Jersey Devils, 2002, 3 
Michael Cammalleri, Los Angeles Kings, 2001, 2 
Brandon Rogers, Mighty Ducks of Anaheim, 2001, 4 
David Moss, Calgary Flames, 2001, 7 
Mike Komisarek, Montreal Canadiens, 2001, 1 
Michael Woodford Jr., Florida Panthers, 2001, 4 
Milan Gajic, Atlanta Thrashers, 2001, 4 
Andy Hilbert, Boston Bruins, 2000, 2 
Jeff Jillson, San Jose Sharks, 1999, 1 
Craig Murray, Montreal Canadiens, 1998, 8 
Josh Blackburn, Phoenix Coyotes, 1998, 5 
Blake Sloan, Dallas Stars, 1998 
Geoff Koch, Nashville Predators, 1998, 3 
Mike Van Ryn, New Jersey Devils, 1998, 1 
John Madden, New Jersey Devils, 1998, 11 
Andrew Merrick, Carolina Hurricanes, 1997, 7 
Josh Langfeld, Ottawa Senators, 1997, 3 
Justin Clark, Colorado Avalanche, 1996, 9 
Sean Ritchlin, New Jersey Devils, 1996, 6 
Bubba Berenzweig, New York Islanders, 1996, 5 
Bill Muckalt, Vancouver Canucks, 1994, 9 
Marty Turco, Dallas Stars, 1994, 5 
Matt Herr, Washington Capitals, 1994, 4 
Greg Crozier, Pittsburgh Penguins, 1994, 3 
Robb Gordon, Vancouver Canucks, 1994, 2 
Jason Botterill, Dallas Stars, 1994, 1 
Mike Legg, New Jersey Devils, 1993, 11 
Warren Luhning, New York Islanders, 1993, 4 
Kevin Hilton, Detroit Red Wings, 1993, 3 
Brendan Morrison, New Jersey Devils, 1993, 2 
Steven Halko, Hartford Whalers, 1992, 10 
Al Sinclair, Ottawa Senators, 1992, 6 
Tim Hogan, Chicago Blackhawks, 1992, 5 
Ryan Sittler, Philadelphia Flyers, 1992, 1 
Brian Wiseman, New York Rangers, 1991, 12 
David Oliver, Edmonton Oilers, 1991, 7 
Steve Shields, Buffalo Sabres, 1991, 5 
Mike Knuble, Detroit Red Wings, 1991, 4 
Aaron Ward, Winnipeg Jets, 1991, 1 
Dan Stiver, Toronto Maple Leafs, 1990, 8 
Patrick Neaton, Pittsburgh Penguins, 1990, 7 
Mark Ouimet, Washington Capitals, 1990, 5 
Chris Tamer, Pittsburgh Penguins, 1990, 4 
Rick Willis, New York Rangers, 1990, 4 
Cam Stewart, Boston Bruins, 1990, 3 
David Harlock, New Jersey Devils, 1990, 2 
Doug Evans, Winnipeg Jets, 1989, 7
Ted Kramer, Los Angeles Kings, 1989, 7 
David Roberts, St. Louis Blues, 1989, 6 
Alex Roberts, Chicago Blackhawks, 1989, 3 
Denny Felsner, St. Louis Blues, 1989, 3 
Mike Moes, Toronto Maple Leafs, 1989, 2 
Don Stone, Detroit Red Wings, 1988, 12 
Mark Sorensen, Washington Capitals, 1988, 10 
Mike Helber, Winnipeg Jets, 1988, 9 
Joe Lockwood, New York, 1987, 3 
Bryan Deasley, Calgary Flames, 1987, 1 
Warren Sharples, Calgary Flames, 1986, 9 
Ryan Pardoski, New Jersey Devils, 1986, 8 
Brad Turner, Minnesota North Stars, 1986, 3 
Todd Copeland, New Jersey Devils, 1986, 2 
Jeff Urban, St. Louis Blues, 1985, 9 
Mike Cusack, Philadelphia Flyers, 1985, 8 
Myles O'Connor, New Jersey Devils, 1985, 3 
Sean Baker, Buffalo Sabres, 1984, 12  
Billy Powers, Philadelphia Flyers, 1984, 9 
Brad Jones, Winnipeg Jets, 1984, 8 
Brad McCaughey, Montreal Canadiens, 1984, 8 
Gary Lorden, Winnipeg Jets, 1984, 6 
Jeff Norton, New York Islanders, 1984, 3 
John Bjorkman, New York, 1983, 11 
Bill Brauer, Montreal Canadiens, 1982, 12 
Pat Goff, New York, 1982, 11 
Greg Hudas, Detroit Red Wings, 1982, 7 
Todd Carlile, Minnesota North Stars, 1982, 6 
Dave Richter, Minnesota North Stars, 1980, 10 
Brian Lundberg, Pittsburgh Penguins, 1980, 9 
Paul Fricker, Hartford Whalers, 1980, 9
Murray Eaves, Winnipeg Jets, 1980, 3 
Jeff Mars, Montreal Canadiens, 1978, 13 
Rod Pacholzuk, Washington Capitals, 1978, 13 
Dan Lerg, St. Louis Blues, 1978, 10 
Doug Todd, Atlanta Flames, 1978, 9 
John Olver, Colorado Rockies, 1978, 8 
Dean Turner, New York, 1978, 3
Mark Miller, New York, 1977, 12
Dan Hoene, St. Louis Blues, 1976, 11
Rob Palmer, Los Angeles Kings, 1976, 5
Dave Debol, Chicago Blackhawks, 1976, 4
David Shand, Atlanta Flames, 1976, 1
Doug Lindskog, St. Louis Blues, 1975, 7
Gary Morrison, Philadelphia Flyers, 1975, 5
Pat Hughes, Montreal Canadiens, 1975, 3
Tom Lindskog, Atlanta Flames, 1974, 8
Don Dufek, Detroit Red Wings, 1974, 6
Angie Moretto, California Golden Seals, 1973, 11
Greg Fox, Atlanta Flames, 1973, 11
Bernie Gagnon, St. Louis Blues, 1969, 3

Softball
Jenny Allard, first-team All-American and Big Ten Player of the Year in 1989, inducted into the Athletic Hall of Honor in 2008, current head coach of the Harvard softball team
Patti Benedict, first-team All-American in 1993, Big Ten Player of the Year in 1992 and 1993
Michelle Bolster, Big Ten Player of the Year in 1988, current head coach of the Indiana Hoosiers softball team
Amanda Chidester, first-team All-American in 2011, Big Ten Player of the Year in 2010 and 2011, holds UM record for career home runs
Traci Conrad, first-team All-American in 1997 and 1998, first player to win two Big Ten batting titles, holds Big Ten record with 345 career hits
Sara Driesenga, compiled a 31–9 record with 247 strikeouts and a 1.89 ERA in 2013
Samantha Findlay, first-team All-American in 2007, MVP of the 2005 Women's College World Series, holds UM records for home runs in RBIs in a career (219), career slugging percentage (.677), and RBIs in a season (77)
Sara Griffin, first-team All-American in 1995, 1996, and 1998, compiled a win–loss record of 106–19 at Michigan
Tiffany Haas, first-team All-American in 2005, led the 2005 national championship team in hits
Kelsey Kollen, first-team All-American in 2001, married to Major League Baseball pitcher and fellow UM alum J. J. Putz
Kelly Kovach, first-team All-American in 1995, Academic All-American 1994–1995, Big Ten Pitcher of the Year in 1992 and 1995
Jessica Merchant, captain of the 2005 Michigan team that won the 2005 Women's College World Series; Offensive Player of the Year in National Pro Fastpitch in 2006
Vicki Morrow, Big Ten Player of the Year in 1987; Big Ten All-Decade Team; inducted into the Athletic Hall of Honor in 2004
Nikki Nemitz, first-team All-American in 2009; career record of 92-16 as a pitcher at Michigan
Jennie Ritter, USA Softball's Player of the Year and first-team All-American in 2005; three victories for USA Elite Team at the Canada Cup; led the Elite Team to a gold medal at the Intercontinental Cup
Sierra Romero, Big Ten Player of the Year as a freshman in 2013; broke UM's single-season home run record
Alicia Seegert, set Big Ten records for batting average (.418 in 1984), hits, total bases and RBIs; inducted into the Athletic Hall of Honor in 2006
Kellyn Tate, All-Big Ten player 1996, 1997, and 1998; won the Women's Pro Softball League batting title in 1998
Jordan Taylor, compiled a 31–4 record as a freshman in 2008; co-Big Ten Player of the Year in 2010 with a 26–3 record and a 1.42 ERA
Haylie Wagner, unanimously selected as Big Ten Pitcher of the Year in 2012 after compiling a 32–7 record and a 1.53 earned run average as a freshman

Swimming
International Swimming Hall of Fame inductees, including year of induction:

Sal Barba, 2009/2010, Olympic Trial finalist; Massachusetts state record holder in 100-yard backstroke
Mike Barrowman, 1997, Swimming USA
Gustavo Borges, 2012, Swimming BRA
Dick Degener, 1971, Diving USA
Tom Dolan, 2006, Swimming USA, 1996 (Atlanta) and 2000 (Sydney) Summer Olympics gold medalist and former world record holder
Taylor Drysdale, 1994, Swimming USA
Ginny Duenkel, 1985, Swimming USA
Jamison "Jam" Handy, 1965, Contributor USA
Bruce Harlan, 1973, Diving USA*
Harry Holiday, 1991, Swimming USA
Dick Kimball, 1985, Coach/Diving USA**
Micki King, 1978, Diving USA
Matthew Mann II, 1965, Coach USA/Great Britain
Richard O. Papenguth, 1986, Coach USA****
Michael Phelps, Swimming USA, 2000 Sydney, 2004 Athens and 2008 Beijing Summer Olympics; 21-time gold medal-winner who currently holds seven world records
Carl Robie, 1976, Swimming USA
Gus Stager, 1982, Coach USA
Bob Webster, 1970, Diving USA

Track and field
Dan Cooke, 2002 and 2004 Big Ten champion in the DMR
Brian Diemer (1983), 1984 Summer Olympics bronze medalist in the steeplechase
Bill Donakowski (1980), US Marathon champion in 1986
Charlie Fonville, set world record in the shot put, 1948
Elmer Gedeon, Big Ten track champion, killed in World War II
DeHart Hubbard, first African American gold medalist in individual event at the 1924 Paris Olympics, member of the Omega Psi Phi fraternity (Phi Chapter)
Katie McGregor (BA English 1999), eight-time NCAA All-American; three-time NCAA champion; three-time Big Ten Conference champion; has won four USATF national championships in distance races since 2005
Greg Meyer (1978), Detroit Marathon champion (1980, course record); Chicago Marathon champion (1982) and Boston Marathon champion (1983)
Penny Neer, first female athlete from UM to win a national title in a track and field event, winning the discus at the 1982 AIAW outdoor championship, two-time AIAW All-American and three-time Big Ten Conference discus champion
Tiffany Adaez Porter (formerly Tiffany Ofili and Tiffany Ofili-Porter) (November 13, 1987) (Ph.D.), 100 metres hurdles
Lisa Larsen Weidenbach Rainsberger (1983), won the Boston and Chicago Marathons; last American woman to win the Boston Marathon; finished 4th in the Marathon Olympic Trials three times in 1984, 1988 and 1992.
Tom Robinson, athlete from the Bahamas; competed in sprint events
Jerome Singleton, Paralympic athlete competing mainly in category T44 (single below knee amputation) sprint events
Kevin Sullivan (BSE CEE 1998), 14-time All-American, four-time NCAA Champion, 12-time Big Ten Champion in cross country and track; placed 5th in the 2000 Olympics in Sydney, Australia in the 1,500-meter event for Canada
Eddie Tolan, gold medals in 100 and 200 metres, 1932 Olympics; set world record in 100 metres at 9.5
Bob Ufer, set world indoor record of 48.1 in the indoor 440-yard; All-American, 1943; once held eight U-M track records; broadcaster of U-M football, 1944–81
Willis Ward, NCAA champion in high jump, long jump, 100-yard dash, 400-yard dash; second in voting for AP Big Ten Athlete of the Year, 1933; second African-American in football
William Watson, Big Ten champion in discus, 1937–39; broad jump, 1937–38; shot put, 1937–38; javelin, 1939
Alan Webb (MDNG: 2001, 2002), miler; at the New Balance Games in January, Webb's mile time of 3:59.86 seconds at New York City's made him the first American high school miler ever to run under four minutes indoors; current American record holder in the mile run at 3:46.91
Nicholas "Nick" Willis (MNZOM) middle-distance runner; five-time NCAA All-American; six-time Big Ten Champion; two-time NCAA Champion; finalist in the 1500m at 2003 NCAA Championships; runner-up in the 3000m at 2004 NCAA Championships;  2005 indoor champion for the mile; three-time Commonwealth Games medalist winning a Commonwealth Games gold medal in the 1500m in 2006, and bronze medals in 2010 and 2014; represented his native New Zealand at 4 successive Commonwealth Games.Won Olympic silver medal in 2008,and won an Olympic bronze medal in Rio in 2016.Has represented New Zealand at 3 successive Olympic Games.

Tennis

Peter Fishbach (born 1947), tennis player
 Eric Friedler (born 1954), tennis player
Barry MacKay, tennis player, tournament director and tennis broadcaster
 Joel Ross, tennis player
MaliVai Washington, tennis player, ranked the No. 1 college player in the US at the end of his sophomore season; 1996 Wimbledon men's singles finalist, first African American male to reach the Wimbledon final since Arthur Ashe in 1975

Various
Elizabeth ("Betsey") Armstrong, water polo goalkeeper
Ryan Bertin, two-time NCAA champion wrestler
Bora Gulari (COE: 2001 BS ASE), named Rolex Yachtsman of the Year in 2009; won his first Moth world championship his second time out and became the first American in 33 years to claim the class' world title; included a win of the Harken McLube Moth Pacific Rim Championship along with second-place finishes at the Moth U.S. National Championship and U.S. Pacific Coast Championship; 2013 Moth national and world champion
Janet Guthrie, first woman to compete in the Indianapolis 500 and the first woman to compete in the Daytona 500
Newton C. Loken (Ph.D.), former artistic gymnast and coach of gymnastics, trampolining and cheerleading; coach of the University of Michigan gymnastics team for 36 years from 1948 to 1983
Dave Porter, former two-time NCAA collegiate wrestling champion and football player
Brandi Rhodes, professional wrestler and personality.  
Robert Rechsteiner (a.k.a. Rick Steiner), amateur and professional wrestler; amateur standout at the University of Michigan, placing 4th at an NCAA championship competition
Scott Rechsteiner (B.S.E.) (a.k.a. Scott Steiner), amateur and professional wrestler
Alan I. Rothenberg (A.B., 1960; LAW: J.D., 1963), chairman of the board of the 1994 World Cup Organizing Committee, president of the U.S. Soccer Federation and founder and chair of Major League Soccer
Steve Warner, 2000, winner of 1997 Caviston Oar, back-to-back winner of Maize and Blue Award (1999-00), 2004 U.S. Olympian in Lightweight Four
Joe Warren (born 1976), Greco-Roman wrestler and mixed martial artist

Olympians
Greg Barton (BSE ME 1983), four-time Olympic medalist in sprint kayaking; won double gold at the 1988 Summer Olympic in Seoul
Fernando Cañales, 1976 (Montreal), 1980 (Moscow) and 1984 (Los Angeles) Summer Olympics participant and member of the Puerto Rican Hall of Fame
Meryl Davis, ice dancing; with partner Charlie White won 2009 U.S. championship,  2010 Vancouver Olympics silver medal, and 2014 Sochi Olympics gold medal
Tom Dolan, 1996 (Atlanta) and 2000 (Sydney) Summer Olympics gold medalist swimmer
Gordon Downie 1976 (Montreal) Summer Olympics bronze medalist swimmer
Steve Fraser, 1984 (Los Angeles) Olympics Greco-Roman wrestling gold medalist 
Andy Hrovat, three-time NCAA All-American wrestler; 2008 Summer Olympics competitor in wrestling
Brent Lang (BSE IO 1990), 1988 (Seoul) Olympics gold medallist in swimming as a member of the 400-meter freestyle relay team
Matthew Mann, Olympic swim coach
Bill Martin (BUS: MBA 1965), President of the United States Olympic Committee USOC
Alan McClatchey, 1976 (Montreal) Summer Olympics bronze medalist swimmer
Sam Mikulak, 2012 and 2016 Olympic gymnast
Richard O. Papenguth, Olympic swim coach
Michael Phelps, Olympic swimmer 2000 (Sydney), 2004 (Athens), 2008 (Beijing), 2012 (London), 2016 (Rio de Janeiro), multiple gold medalist
Alfonso Qua (BSE ChE ’56), Olympic sailor (Soling) 1972 Kiel
Elise Ray, Olympic gymnast
Nicholas ‘Nick’ Willis (MNZOM),is a 4-time Olympian representing New Zealand at the 2004 Athens Olympics, 2008 Beijing Olympics (Silver  medallist, 1500 metres), 2012 London Olympics, 2016 Rio Olympics (Bronze medalist, 1500 metres)
Marcel Wouda, Olympic swimmer

Through the 2004 Summer Olympics in Athens, 178 Michigan student-athletes and coaches had participated in the Olympics. The university has had medal winners in every Summer Olympics except 1896, and gold medalists in all but four Olympiads. A total of 22 countries, including the U.S., have been represented by Michigan athletes.

A Table of Michigan Olympians

Coaches
George Allen (MS 1947), Virginia Sports Hall of Fame 1998; Pro Football Hall of Fame 2002; Los Angeles Rams head coach (1978, fired after two preseason games); Washington Redskins head coach (1971–77); Los Angeles Rams head coach (1966–70); Chicago Bears defensive coordinator (1962–65); Chicago Bears personnel director/assistant coach (1958–61); Los Angeles Rams assistant coach (1957)
Charles A. Baird (A.B. 1895) (c. 1870–1944), football manager, university athletic director, and banker; first athletic director at the University of Michigan
Daniel Earle McGugin (1879-1936), football player, coach and lawyer; called by some the dean of SEC football
Harold "Tubby" Raymond (BSE ), former head football and baseball coach University of Delaware
Jon Charles Urbanchek (BS 1962) U. of Michigan men's swimming and diving head coach 1982–2004, NCAA Championship 1995; Olympic swim coach 1976, 1984, 1988, 1992, 1996, 2000, 2004, 2008; International Swimming Hall of Fame; coached numerous NCAA and world champions, gold medalists and world record holders

Team ownership and other sports business
William Davidson (BUS: BBA 1947), finance and entertainment billionaire; founder of the William Davidson Institute at the Ross School of Business; Chairman of Guardian Industries, world's largest glass manufacturer; owner of the Detroit Pistons (NBA), Detroit Shock (WNBA), Tampa Bay Lightning (NHL) at his death in 2009
Wycliffe Grousbeck (LAW: JD), assumed the role of Managing Partner and CEO of the Boston Celtics on December 31, 2002, after leading a local investment group that purchased the team
Tom Lewand (AB ’91/MBA/JD ’96), President of the Detroit Lions
Robert Nederlander (AB 1955, LAW: JD 1958), limited partner of the New York Yankees; director of Realogy Corporation since August 2006; director of Realogy Corporation's predecessor parent company, Cendant, since December 1997, chairman of Cendant's corporate governance committee since October 2002
 Rob Pelinka (BUS: B.B.A. 1993; LAW: J.D. 1996), basketball player at UM; prominent agent for many NBA stars, most notably Kobe Bryant
Alan I. Rothenberg (A.B., 1960; LAW: J.D., 1963), chairman of the board of the 1994 FIFA World Cup Organizing Committee; president of the U.S. Soccer Federation; founder and chair of Major League Soccer
Harvey Schiller (Ph.D.), member of Great Court Capital of New York and former United States Olympic Committee chief; former president of the International Baseball Federation and CEO of Global Options Group, a security investigation company; 24 years as an Air Force pilot, combat service in Vietnam; commissioner of the Southeastern Conference, USOC chief and head of sports at Turner Broadcasting
Richard P. Tinkham (LAW: 1957), American Basketball Association (ABA) co-founder; co-founded the original ABA and the Indiana Pacers franchise in 1967; served for two years as President of the ABA Board of Trustees;  instrumental in the creation of Market Square Arena in Indianapolis in 1972–75
Preston Robert (Bob) Tisch (BA 1948), billionaire chairman of the Loews Corporation; United States Postmaster General from 1986 to 1988; owned 50 percent of the New York Giants football team
Fred Wilpon (AB 1958), president, CEO, and co-owner of the New York Mets baseball team; chairman of the board of Sterling Equities, Inc., a real estate investment and development firm, and of Pathogenesis Corp., a biotechnology company
Ralph C. Wilson, Jr., owned Buffalo Bills football team
Arthur Wirtz (AB 1923) (1901-1983), powerful figure in sports and arena operation; owner of Chicago Stadium, Olympia Stadium in Detroit, the Bismarck Hotel in Chicago, the Chicago Blackhawks, and the Chicago Bulls

See also
University of Michigan Athletic Hall of Honor
Michigan Wolverines Football All-Americans

References

External links
University of Michigan alumni
Famous U-M alumni
Alumni association of the University of Michigan
UM alumni information

University of Michigan sporting alumni
Sporting